The Perfect Match is a 2017 Taiwanese romantic comedy series. It was first broadcast on 3 March 2017.

Plot
Huo Ting En is a renowned chef who trained at Le Cordon Bleu in Paris. He specializes in Curry dishes from Japan, Thailand, Malaysia, Sri Lanka, and India at his restaurant, La Mure. He crosses paths with Night Market chef Wei Fen Qing after netizens claim that her dishes are a cheaper version of his. Love eventually blooms between the two, but their union is hindered by a past secret.

Cast

Main cast
Wu Kang-jen as Huo Ting En is a celebrated chef, general manager of Yanis corporation's and head chef at a high end restaurant La Mure. He feels guilty over his sister's death. Wei Fen Qing reminds him of his sister and he decides to teach her how to make curry. He falls for her but decides to stay away due to a past tragedy.
Ivy Shao as Wei Fen Qing is a strong and loving girl who owns a cooking stall at the night market, named as Civilian version of Huo Ting En by the netizens on the internet. She aspires to revive the name of her father, the Curry King. She accepts the challenge of Ting En to recreate his taste but loses and ends up as his apprentice. She eventually falls for him.
Ben Wu as Meng Shao Wei is the wealthy heir who leaves home for love but finds a new life working in the night market and befriending Wei Fen Qing. He has feelings for Wei Fen Qing but she only sees him as a friend.
Xiao Man as Meng Ru Xi is a food critic, sister of Meng Shao Wei, who falls for Huo Ting En and helps him on many occasions but he doesn't reciprocate her feelings. She eventually gets together with Huo Tian Zhi.
Nylon Chen  as Huo Tian Zhi is the second son of Huo family,  assistant general manager of Yanis corporation and step brother of Huo Ting En. He loves his brother and makes efforts to unite Meng Ru Xi and Huo Ting En only to fall for Ru Xi after having a one night stand with her.

Supporting cast
Liu Shu Hong as Peng Xiao Bin 
Hsieh Li-chin as Yu Jie 
Stanley Mei as Chen Jin Wang 
Gao Wei Teng as Uncle Spareribs 
An Ji as Zhen Zhen 
Kiki as Nai Nai 
Hu Pei-Lien as Qiu Shu Feng 
Zhang Cheng Wei as Wei Cheng Yang 
Jackson Lou as Meng Xing Da
Kelly Mi as Xiao Hai Wei
Su Yi Jing as Gong Mei Li
Li Xing as Yang Yu Qing 
 Shen Hai Rong as Wen Xiu Zhi 
Rim as Brian
 Zhang Ji Quan as Jack

Cameo
 Weber Yang as Ku Le-chun 
 Mini Tsai as Wu Ping-fan
 Lung Shao-hua as Jung Fu-hsiung

Soundtrack
"Pray for Love 為愛而愛" by GBOYSWAG 
"Playhouse 家家酒" by Jia Jia 
"See Through 看透" by Jia Jia 
"Hey" by Jia Jia 
"Make It Real" by GBOYSWAG 
"I'm Super Ready" by GBOYSWAG 
"Loved Someone 很愛過一個人" by Della Wu 
"Life of Planet 少年他的奇幻漂流" by Mayday

Broadcast

Ratings

: The average rating calculation does not include special episode.

External links
 

Sanlih E-Television original programming
Eastern Television original programming
Taiwanese drama television series
2017 Taiwanese television series debuts
2017 Taiwanese television series endings
Taiwanese romance television series
Cooking television series
Works about chefs